Judan can refer to:

 Judan, Iran, a village in Markazi Province, Iran
 Judan, Isfahan, a village in Isfahan Province, Iran
 The 10th degree black belt in Dan rank in Japan
 Judan (Go), a Go competition in Japan
 A shogi competition in Japan between 1962 and 1987; see Ryu-oh